Slaughterhouse Rock (also known as Hell Island in the United Kingdom) is a 1988 American supernatural horror film directed by Dimitri Logothetis, and starring Nicholas Celozzi, Tom Reilly, Donna Denton, Hope Marie Carlton, Tammara Hyler, Steven Brian Smith, Ty Miller, and Toni Basil. Its plot follows a college student who travels to Alcatraz Island with his friends, after having recurring nightmares of a rock band that was killed there.

Plot
Alex Gardner (Nicholas Celozzi), a college student suffers from recurring nightmares in which he experiences the deaths of the victims of a vicious killer who lived on Alcatraz, before it became a prison. When the nightmares begin manifesting in reality, and his friends see him hovering over his bed, his teacher (Donna Denton), an occultist, tells him to go to the island to face down the ghost of the killer. The friends become stranded on the island, and Alex's brother Richard (Tom Reilly) becomes possessed, killing some friends and raping one of the girls. Alex is aided in his quest by the ghost of Sammy Mitchell (Toni Basil), a singer for the band Bodybag. Sammy teaches Alex how to levitate and escape his body, and is also the subject of a dance routine, intercut into the film. The friends lure the ghost of the killer, and Alex's brother into the prison chapel, and blow it up, releasing the curse.

Cast

Production
Principal photography of Slaughterhouse Rock took place in Los Angeles, California, beginning March 23, 1987. Actor Larry Wilcox would reportedly star in the film, but was not involved with the production.

Release
Slaughterhouse Rock premiered in Chicago, Illinois on January 22, 1988, before premiering in New York City on May 21 of that year.

Critical response
Caryn James of The New York Times wrote, “There is always a way to improve on a stock formula, but Slaughterhouse Rock [...] manages to make these elements seem much worse and even more tired than they are,” though she praised the performance of Steve Brian Smith.

Home media
Sony Pictures Home Entertainment released Slaughterhouse Rock on VHS in 1988, while Image Entertainment later released the film on Laserdisc on November 18, 1992. On December 5, 2016, Code Red released Slaughterhouse Rock on Blu-ray, which was followed by a DVD release by Kino Lorber on May 30, 2017. It has also been released on blu-ray by Vinegar Syndrome as part of a two-disk set with Hard Rock Zombies.

References

External links
 
 
 
 

1988 comedy films
1988 films
1988 horror films
1988 independent films
1980s comedy horror films
1980s prison films
1980s supernatural films
1980s teen horror films
American comedy horror films
American ghost films
American prison films
American rock music films
American supernatural horror films
American teen comedy films
American teen horror films
Demons in film
Films about nightmares
Films about spirit possession
Films scored by Mark Mothersbaugh
Films set in prison
Films set in San Francisco
Films set on islands
Films directed by Dimitri Logothetis
1980s English-language films
1980s American films